The Sony Xperia Z3 is an Android smartphone produced by Sony. Part of the Sony Xperia Z series, the Xperia Z3, at that point known by the project code name "Leo", was unveiled during a press conference at IFA 2014 on September 4, 2014. It was first released in Taiwan on September 19, 2014.

Specifications

Hardware
Like its predecessors, the Xperia Z3's design consists of a metal frame with a glass backing; the metal frame has been rounded, and the device itself is slightly slimmer than the Z2. The device carries slightly higher IP ratings for water and dust-proofing than the Z2. The device features a 2.5 GHz quad-core Qualcomm Snapdragon 801 system-on-chip with 3 GB of RAM. The Z3 includes a non-removable 3100 mAh battery. The Xperia Z3's rear-facing camera is 20.7 megapixels with a Sony Exmor RS image sensor, along with improvements to its "SteadyShot" and "Intelligent Active" modes.

Software
The Xperia Z3 ships with Android 4.4.4 "KitKat" with Sony's custom interface and software. New additions to the Z3's software include the Lifelog app, Sony Select, and support for Remote Play on the PlayStation 4 video game console. Android 5.0 "Lollipop" was first released for the Z3 in March 2015 in selected territories. Android 6.0 "Marshmallow" was first released in April 2016.

Developer preview builds of Android 7.0 "Nougat" were released for the Z3, but Sony stated that it is unable to release the final version due to "unforeseen platform limitations"; Qualcomm stated that it will not provide support for Nougat on any device using the Snapdragon 801 or 800 chipsets. The Adreno 330 GPU does not support the Vulkan or OpenGL ES 3.1 graphics APIs, which must be present in order to meet Google certification requirements for 7.0.

Release history
On October 23, 2014, Sony Mobile released the Japan-only SOL26 and SO-01G models for au by KDDI and NTT DoCoMo respectively, as well as the Sony Xperia Z3v (D6708), a variant of the Xperia Z3 exclusively for Verizon Wireless in the United States. On October 29, 2014, the D6616 model was released exclusively for T-Mobile US and on November 21, 2014, Sony Mobile released the 401SO model exclusively for SoftBank Mobile in Japan. 

The Xperia Z3 (D6616 model) was quietly discontinued by T-Mobile in April 2015, but returned to store shelves less than a month later with a price reduction. Verizon discontinued the Xperia Z3v (D6708) in August 2015.

Reception

Critical reception
The Xperia Z3 generally received positive reviews, with critics praising its durability, battery life and improved display. Although many critics argued that the Z3 is just a minor upgrade from the Z2 with not much differences. Pocket Lint criticised the device for the tall design and "occasional software excess" but praised its battery life. The Verge praised the design of the device for being attractive yet rugged, built out of better materials than the Galaxy S5, and also waterproof. The Guardian called the device the best smartphone Sony has ever made, with an improvement in feel and design over its predecessor. However, it criticised the Z3 for lack of wireless charging for something waterproof with "fiddly doors" covering the charging port is disappointing, but it has a magnetic charging port for an accessory dock.

Variants

See also

 Sony Xperia Z3 Compact

References

External links
 

Android (operating system) devices
Mobile phones introduced in 2014
Digital audio players
Mobile phones with 4K video recording
Discontinued flagship smartphones
Sony smartphones